{{DISPLAYTITLE:C47H73NO17}}
The molecular formula C47H73NO17 (molar mass: 924.08 g/mol, exact mass: 923.4878 u) may refer to:

 Amphotericin B

Molecular formulas